The 2018 Cuyahoga County executive election took place on November 6, 2018 to elect the County Executive of Cuyahoga County, Ohio. Incumbent Democratic County Executive Armond Budish won reelection to a second term with 67.47% of the vote, making him the first since the establishment of the office to be reelected.

Democratic primary
Incumbent Armond Budish ran unopposed not only in the Democratic primary, but in the Republican primary too, as no other candidates filed petitions to challenge him.

Candidates

Nominee
 Armond Budish, incumbent County Executive of Cuyahoga County, Ohio

Primary results

Republican primary
No Republican filed petitions with the Cuyahoga County Board of Elections to get on the primary ballot. Peter J. Corrigan ran a successful write-in campaign to become the party's nominee in the general election.

Candidates

Nominee
 Peter J. Corrigan, chief operating officer of Prestolite Electric, Republican nominee for Ohio's 10th congressional district in 2010

Withdrew
 Tanner Fischbach, candidate for County Executive in 2014 (did not file for the primary ballot)

Primary Results

General election

Results

Results by municipality

References

Cuyahoga County executive
Cuyahoga County executive
2018 executive